Nitin Soni is an Indian poet and author, based in New Delhi, known for his best selling poetry book The Broken Boat, published by Authorspress in 2016. The Broken Boat reached the #1 best selling poetry book slot Amazon India during 2016. He is lyricist of The Kalam Anthem, dedicated to former president APJ Abdul Kalam, co-written by Srijan Pal Singh. He is also working for underprivileged children.

Books

Poetry collection 
 The Broken Boat (2016)

Anthology 
 40 Under 40: An Anthology of Post-Globalisation, 2016 
 Shades of Suffering: Crumpled Voices, 2015 
 Rudraksha - When Gods Came Calling, 2015 
 UPPER CUT : Change India Initiative, 2014
 Crumpled Voices - Shades of Suffering, 2014
 Syahi, 2014  
 My Dazzling Bards, 2014
 The Significant Anthology, 2014
 Scaling Heights : An Anthology of Contemporary Indian English Poetry, (2013)
 Aatish: Sensitizing Sentient Sentiments, 2013

See also

Indian English Poetry
 List of Indian writers
List of Indian poets in English

References

21st-century Indian poets
English-language poets from India
Poets from Delhi
Living people
Delhi University alumni
Year of birth missing (living people)